Gustavo Rodríguez Iglesias (born 16 September 1979) is a Spanish former professional cyclist and Paralympic guide. He rode in the 2010 Vuelta a España.  

As a Paralympic guide, he led Héctor Catalá Laparra to 2020 Summer Paralympics silver in the paratriathlon PTVI category. Under IPC rules, guides win medals along with their competitors.

Major results
2009
8th Overall Vuelta Ciclista a León

2020
Second in 2020 Paralympics Men's Triathlon PTVI (Guide for Héctor Catalá Laparra)

References

External links

1979 births
Living people
Spanish male cyclists
People from O Baixo Miño
Sportspeople from the Province of Pontevedra
Cyclists from Galicia (Spain)